The Carriker's mountain-tanager (Dubusia carrikeri) is a species of Neotropical bird in the tanager family Thraupidae. Carriker's mountain-tanager is found only in montane forest in Santa Marta, Colombia. The Carriker's mountain-tanager is sometimes regarded as a subspecies of the Buff-breasted mountain tanager but has been distinguished otherwise in 2016 by the IUCN Red List. As of today, its population is in decline due to habitat damage by recreation, pollution, and climate change.

References 

carrikeri
Birds described in 1946
Endemic birds of Colombia